Natha Clyde Anderson (born 1972) is an American politician, lobbyist, and educator serving as a member of the Nevada Assembly from the 30th district. She assumed office on November 4, 2020.

Early life and education 
Anderson was born in Reno, Nevada in 1972. She earned a Bachelor of Arts degree in education from the University of Nevada, Reno. Anderson's father, Bernard "Bernie" Anderson, served as a member of the Nevada Assembly from 1991 to 2010.

Career 
Prior to entering politics, Anderson worked as a teacher. She was also the president of the Washoe Education Association. She was elected to the Nevada Assembly in 2020, succeeding Greg Smith.

References 

Living people
1972 births
Women state legislators in Nevada
People from Reno, Nevada
University of Nevada, Reno alumni
Democratic Party members of the Nevada Assembly
People from Washoe County, Nevada
Educators from Nevada
21st-century American politicians
21st-century American women politicians
National Education Association people
Trade unionists from Nevada